Merlo S.p.A. is an Italian  manufacturer of telescopic handlers based in Cuneo, Piedmont, with a  factory. It has over 600 dealers world-wide.

History
Merlo was founded in 1911 in Cuneo. In the beginning the company managers worked in a small workshop. In 1964 the company took new direction of production and improved the state of the company into that of big machine manufacturer. In 1966 the company built their first concrete mixers and in 1970 their first off-road fork lift truck. In 1981 Merlo produced their first telescopic handler, the SM 30. The company continues to specialize in handlers.

Past models
Dumpers:
DM 
DBM

lift trucks
CEM
P23.6
P26.6
P28
P30
P32
P34
ROTO

References

Manufacturing companies of Italy
Companies based in Piedmont
Cuneo